In the inaugural edition of the tournament, Amos Mansdorf won the title after defeating Alexander Volkov 6–3, 7–6 in the final.

Seeds

Draw

Finals

Top half

Bottom half

References

External links
 Official results archive (ATP)
 Official results archive (ITF)

Rosmalen Grass Court Championships
1990 ATP Tour